Showcase is a studio album by American country music singer Patsy Cline, recorded with The Jordanaires and released November 27, 1961. It was Cline's second studio album and her first since Patsy Cline in 1957.

Background

The album produced two singles that became hits on both the Billboard country and pop charts. The first, "I Fall to Pieces," became Cline's first number one hit on the Billboard country chart and also reached the Top 15 on the pop Top 100 in 1961. The follow-up single, "Crazy," was nearly as big a hit as "I Fall to Pieces," peaking in the top five on the Billboard country chart and in the Top 10 on the pop Top 100. "Crazy" was recorded after Cline's month-long hospitalization following a near-fatal car accident that June.

The original cover showed three different photos of Cline from a 1957 promotional photograph, according to Jay Orr and Ron Roy in the album's liner notes.

After her death, the album was re-released on Decca in 1963 and peaked for the first time on the Billboard 200, reaching number 73. The cover was changed to the more familiar shot of Cline in a white blouse, red capri pants and gold booties,. The album was reissued in 1973 by MCA Records (which took over Decca in 1973) and it was later digitally remastered and re-released on a CD/LP/Cassette in 1988, which included the same cover as the 1963 re-release.

Showcase was also released internationally. In 1961, the album was released in the United Kingdom by Brunswick Records and in New Zealand by Festival Records.

Recording sessions

Recording began November 16, 1960 at the Bradley Film and Recording Studios in Nashville, Tennessee over five sessions, ending August 25, 1961. Showcase was the first set of sessions after Cline's near-death in a car crash in 1961. The recordings teamed her up with The Jordanaires, who recorded also on Cline's 1962 album on Decca. Legendary country producer Owen Bradley produced the album. Bradley helped smooth Cline's sound to develop her own style of the Nashville sound.

Individual tracks
This album includes many cover versions of previously recorded hits on the country and pop charts by other artists. The remakes include pop singer Gogi Grant's "The Wayward Wind," Bonnie Lou's "Seven Lonely Days," Cole Porter's "True Love," and Bob Wills' "San Antonio Rose."

In addition, Cline recorded remakes of her 1957 hits, "Walkin' After Midnight" and "A Poor Man's Roses (Or a Rich Man's Gold)."

Track listings

Vinyl version

Compact disc version

Digital version

Personnel
All credits are adapted from the original 1961 liner notes of Showcase.

Musical personnel

 Byron Bach – cello
 Brenton Banks – violin
 George Binkley III – violin
 Owen Bradley – organ (session 3 only)
 John Bright – viola
 Cecil Brower – viola
 Patsy Cline – lead vocals
 Floyd Cramer – piano
 Hank Garland – electric guitar
 Buddy Harman – drums
 Walter Haynes – steel guitar
 Randy Hughes – acoustic guitar
 Lillian Hunt – violin
 The Jordanaires – background vocals
 Ben Keith – steel guitar
 Doug Kirkham – drums
 Grady Martin – electric guitar
 Bob Moore – acoustic bass
 Suzanne Parker – piano
 Hargus "Pig" Robbins – piano

Technical personnel
 Owen Bradley – Producer

Chart performance

References

1961 albums
Patsy Cline albums
Albums produced by Owen Bradley
Decca Records albums
MCA Records albums